Variational may refer to:

Calculus of variations, a field of mathematical analysis that deals with maximizing or minimizing functionals
Variational method (quantum mechanics), a way of finding approximations to the lowest energy eigenstate or ground state in quantum physics
Variational Bayesian methods, a family of techniques for approximating integrals in Bayesian inference and machine learning
Variational properties, properties of an organism relating to the production of variation among its offspring in evolutionary biology
Variationist sociolinguistics or variational sociolinguistics, the study of variation in language use among speakers or groups of speakers

See also
List of variational topics in mathematics and physics
Variation (disambiguation)